The following events occurred in March 1956:

March 1, 1956 (Thursday)
The NATO phonetic alphabet (the International Radiotelephony Spelling Alphabet) is drafted by the International Air Transport Association for the International Civil Aviation Organization.
In Washington, D.C., United States, a replica of the Discus Thrower is dedicated; it is a gift from the Italian government to acknowledge the return of art objects looted during World War II.
Born: 
Tim Daly, US actor, in New York City
Dalia Grybauskaitė, Lithuanian politician, President (2009-2019), in Vilnius

March 2, 1956 (Friday)
Morocco reaches agreement with France, ending the protectorate, to become the independent "Kingdom of Morocco".
While rehearsing for a coming air show, four Canadair Sabre fighter planes of the Sky Lancers aerobatics team of No. 4 Wing, Royal Canadian Air Force, based in West Germany, crash in the Upper Rhine Valley southwest of Strasbourg, France, while performing a loop in formation; all four pilots are killed, and RCAF aerobatic flying stops.
Born: Eduardo Rodríguez, Bolivian politician, President 2005–06, in Cochabamba

March 3, 1956 (Saturday)
A state election in New South Wales, Australia, results in the Australian Labor Party, under incumbent Premier Joseph Cahill, retaining a majority over a coalition of the Liberal and Country parties.

March 4, 1956 (Sunday)
Popular demonstrations begin in the Georgian Soviet Socialist Republic, protesting against Nikita Khrushchev's de-Stalinization policy. 
Elections to the National Constituent Assembly take place in South Vietnam. President Ngo Dinh Diem's party wins 90 of the 123 seats.

March 5, 1956 (Monday)
The last steam locomotive to have been purchased new by Southern Pacific Railroad is retired from service.
Born: Teena Marie, US singer-songwriter, in Santa Monica, under the name Mary Christine Brockert (died 2010)

March 6, 1956 (Tuesday)
West Germany's Bundestag approves 14 constitutional amendments which allow for rearmament and civilian control over the armed forces, re-introducing conscription.

March 7, 1956 (Wednesday)
Avalanches in Norway's Nordland and Troms regions cause 21 deaths and heavy damage.
Born: Bryan Cranston, US actor, in Hollywood

March 8, 1956 (Thursday)
In the Hong Kong municipal election, four of the six seats are won by the Reform Club of Hong Kong, and the other two by the new Hong Kong Civic Association.

March 9, 1956 (Friday)
British security forces deport Archbishop Makarios III from Cyprus; he arrives in Mahe Island, Seychelles, as a "guest" of Governor Sir William Addis.
In Tbilisi, where pro-Stalin protests continue, Soviet troops fire on a demonstrating crowd, resulting in at least 100 casualties.

March 10, 1956 (Saturday)
It becomes the first aircraft to exceed  in level flight, with permission, but no active support, from the British government.
A United States Air Force Boeing B-47 Stratojet and its 3-man crew disappear over the Mediterranean Sea. The wreckage has to date not been located.

March 11, 1956 (Sunday)
The Belgian ship MV Prince de Liege catches fire off the coast of Spain and is abandoned by its crew. The ship is towed by a Spanish naval tug then by the Swedish salvage ship Herakles to Gibraltar.

March 12, 1956 (Monday)
101 members of the U.S. Senate and House of Representatives sign the Southern Manifesto, in protest against the 1954 Supreme Court ruling (Brown v. Board of Education), opposing racial integration in public places.
The Dow Jones Industrial Average closes above 500 for the first time rising 2.40 points, or 0.48%, to 500.24.

March 13, 1956 (Tuesday)
In the United States New Hampshire Democratic Party primary, Estes Kefauver of Tennessee defeats Adlai Stevenson, the eventual winner of the Democratic nomination.
Born: Motoharu Sano, Japanese musician and singer-songwriter, in Taitō, Tokyo
Died: David Browning, 24, 1952 Olympic diving gold medalist from the United States, in jet fighter crash near Rantoul, Kansas during a training flight

March 14, 1956 (Wednesday)
The French fishing trawler Vert Prairial is driven ashore at Wireless Point, Porthcurno, Cornwall, UK. All seventeen on board lose their lives.
Harry Pollitt, General Secretary of the Communist Party of Great Britain, unveils a memorial to Karl Marx at Highgate Cemetery, London, UK, following the reburial of Marx and his family a few months earlier.

March 15, 1956 (Thursday)
A general election is held in Nyasaland (later Malawi) for the first time ever. The newly elected Legislative Council consisted of eleven officials (five indirectly-elected seats for Africans and six elected seats for non-Africans).
The musical My Fair Lady receives its Broadway première at the Mark Hellinger Theatre, with Rex Harrison in the role of Higgins and Julie Andrews as Eliza. It would run for a record 2,717 performances.

March 16, 1956 (Friday)
Mount Lebanon Governorate, Lebanon, is struck by a magnitude 5.3 earthquake, followed 11 minutes later by a magnitude 5.5 quake in Beqaa Governorate. Overall, 148 people are killed. The second quake was located under Lebanon at a depth of 15.0 km. 
The Riotous Assemblies Act no. 17 is passed by the South African government, prohibiting any outside gathering that the Minister of Justice considers a threat to public peace. Nelson Mandela later became one of many charged with offences under the Act.

March 17, 1956 (Saturday)
Died: 
Fred Allen, 61, US comedian (heart attack)
Irène Joliot-Curie, 58, French physicist, recipient of the Nobel Prize in Chemistry (leukaemia)

March 18, 1956 (Sunday)
US navy destroyer USS Willis A. Lee is driven onto rocks at Jamestown, Rhode Island, in a storm. It was repaired and returned to service later in the year. 
Italian cargo ship SS Etrusco runs aground at Scituate, Massachusetts, United States. All 30 crew members are rescued by breeches buoy.

March 19, 1956 (Monday)
48-year-old Dutch boxer Bep van Klaveren contests his last match in Rotterdam, losing to Werner Handtke.
Born: Yegor Gaidar, Russian economist, politician and author, in Moscow (died 2009)

March 20, 1956 (Tuesday)
Tunisia gains independence from French rule as an independent kingdom under Muhammad VIII al-Amin, the country's last bey.
A 2-day nor'easter, affecting the US Mid-Atlantic States and southern New England, comes to an end, leaving an estimated 162 people dead. 
Died:
Fanny Durack, 66, Australian swimmer  
Wilhelm Miklas, 83, 3rd President of Austria

March 21, 1956 (Wednesday)
At the 28th Academy Awards ceremony in Los Angeles, United States, Marty becomes the shortest film to win the Best Motion Picture award. Its star, Ernest Borgnine, wins Best Actor.

March 22, 1956 (Thursday)
In the early hours of the morning, US singer Carl Perkins is injured in a car accident near Wilmington, Delaware, on his way to New York City to make an appearance on the Perry Como Show. Perkins suffers three fractured vertebrae in his neck, severe concussion, a broken collar bone, and multiple lacerations; he remains unconscious for an entire day.

March 23, 1956 (Friday)
Pakistan adopts a new constitution, becoming the world's first Islamic republic, though it does not adopt a state religion until 1973.
In the UK's Grand National steeplechase, Devon Loch, a horse owned by Queen Elizabeth The Queen Mother and ridden by Dick Francis, inexplicably collapses 50 yards (45 m) from the finish while leading the race. The jockey later suggested that the horse was distracted by the cheers of the crowd.
Born: Ingrid Kristiansen, Norwegian athlete, in Trondheim

March 24, 1956 (Saturday)
Born: Steve Ballmer, US entrepreneur, in Detroit

March 25, 1956 (Sunday)
Died: Robert Newton, 50, English actor (heart attack)

March 26, 1956 (Monday)
 Colonel Tom Parker is formally appointed as Elvis Presley's manager.

March 27, 1956 (Tuesday)
The United States Internal Revenue Service raids the offices of the Communist newspaper The Daily Worker in New York and other locations, for non-payment of taxes. The editor claims that the paper lost $200,000 in the previous year, therefore it owes no taxes.

March 28, 1956 (Wednesday)
The UK cargo ship Changsha runs aground at Tokyo, Japan; it was later successfully refloated.

March 29, 1956 (Thursday)
Four Israeli soldiers captured by Syria in the Golan Heights in 1954 are returned to Israel, in exchange for forty Syrian soldiers captured during Operation Olive Leaves.
The giant sequoia, General Grant, located in Kings Canyon National Park, United States, is declared a "National Shrine" by US President Dwight D. Eisenhower.

March 30, 1956 (Friday)
Bezymianny, a volcano in Russia's Kamchatka Peninsula, erupts, destroying the summit and forming a horseshoe-shaped crater.

March 31, 1956 (Saturday)
Typhoon Sarah approaches the Philippines, but changes direction at the last moment and dissipates within a few days.

References

1956
1956-03
1956-03